This is a list of models who have appeared in the annual Sports Illustrated Swimsuit Issue.

A
Nina Agdal
Adaora Akubilo
Lily Aldridge
Karen Alexander
Kim Alexis
Carol Alt
Michelle Alves
May Andersen

B
Melissa Baker 
Beyoncé
Bianca Balti
Tyra Banks
Natasha Barnard
Ana Beatriz Barros
Michaela Bercu
Kylie Bax
Jamee Becker
Michelle Behennah
Monica Bellucci
Elsa Benítez
Rose Bertram
Simone Biles
Kate Bock
Christie Brinkley

C
Carla Campbell
Naomi Campbell
Caprice
Laetitia Casta
Jeisa Chiminazzo
Hailey Clauson
Kim Cloutier
Cindy Crawford
Ehrinn Cummings

D
 Sonia Dara
Hannah Davis
Jenna de Rosnay
Brooklyn Decker
Yamila Diaz
Cintia Dicker
Lucia Dvorská
Emily DiDonato
Anne de Paula
Lorena Durán

E
Selita Ebanks
Angie Everhart
Kelly Emberg

F
Hannah Ferguson
Luján Fernández
Isabeli Fontana
Louise Forsling
Kenza Fourati
Calle Fetzer

G
Yasmeen Ghauri
Esti Ginzburg
Jessica Gomes
Izabel Goulart
Ashley Graham
Erin Gray

H
Gigi Hadid
Alicia Hall
Bridget Hall
Melissa Haro
Jessica Hart
Erin Heatherton
Bregje Heinen
Julie Henderson
Danielle Herrington
Eva Herzigová
Kristy Hinze
Samantha Hoopes
Marloes Horst
Rachel Hunter

I
Chanel Iman
Kathy Ireland

J
Kate James
Maria João
Olivia Jordan

K
Haley Kalil
Mia Kang
Melissa Keller
Vendela Kirsebom
Heidi Klum
Camille Kostek

L
Robyn Lawley
Shakara Ledard
Estelle Lefebure
Kim Lemanton
Noémie Lenoir
Damaris Lewis
Angela Lindvall
Roberta Little
Kathy Loghry
Michelle Lombardo
Vanessa Lorenzo

M
Shirley Mallmann
Josie Maran
Babette March
Jarah Mariano
Juliana Martins
Judit Mascó
Valeria Mazza
Turia Mau
Elle Macpherson
Lauren Mellor
Ariel Meredith
Kelsey Merritt
Barbara Minty
Alyssa Miller
Marisa Miller
Coco Mitchell
Jolie Mitnick Salter
Solveig Mørk Hansen
Alex Morgan
Fernanda Motta
Carolyn Murphy
Genevieve Morton

N
Aline Nakashima
Petra Nemcova
Navia Nguyen
Chandra North
Yumi Nu

O
Lana Ogilvie
Oluchi Onweagba
Julie Ordon
Carré Otis
Raica Oliveira

P
Irina Pantaeva
Jessica Perez
Daniela Pestova
Ann Peterson
Paulina Porizkova
Tori Praver
Danica Patrick
Barbara Palvin

Q
Audrey Quock

R
Aly Raisman
Emily Ratajkowski
Frankie Rayder
Gabrielle Reece
Bar Refaeli
Crystal Renn
Sofia Resing
Hilary Rhoda
Ashley Richardson
Rachel Roberts
Rebecca Romijn
Kelly Rohrbach
Pania Rose
Ronda Rousey

S
Sara Sampaio
Daniella Sarahyba
Stephanie Seymour
Ingrid Seynhaeve
Maria Sharapova
Irina Shayk
Josephine Skriver
Renée Simonsen
Molly Sims
Amber Smith
Ashley Smith 
Mallory Snyder
Tamara Spoelder
Yvette Sylvander
Yvonne Sylvander

T
Fernanda Tavares
Niki Taylor
Chrissy Teigen
Cheryl Tiegs
Yésica Toscanini

U
Kate Upton
Cris Urena

V
Anne Vyalitsyna
Valerie van der Graaf
Jessica Van Der Steen
Apollonia van Ravenstein
Veronika Vařeková
Michelle Vawer
Patricia Velásquez
Manon von Gerkan

W
Akure Wall
Katherine Webb
Amy Wesson
Caroline Wozniacki
Jessica White
Roshumba Williams
Serena Williams
Stacey Williams

Y
Kara Young

References

Sports Illustrated Swimsuit Edition
models